Outsize cargo is a designation given to goods of unusually large size. This term is often applied to cargo which cannot fit on standardized transport devices such as skids (pallets) or containers. This includes military and other vehicles.

In extreme cases, such as the Space Shuttle or Buran-class spacecraft, the cargo may be carried on the exterior, atop a large cargo aircraft.

See also 

 Boeing Dreamlifter
 Airbus Beluga / Airbus BelugaXL
 Antonov An-225 Mriya
 Aero Spacelines Super Guppy
 Aero Spacelines Pregnant Guppy
 Aero Spacelines Mini Guppy

References

Packaging
Freight transport